The Lagos Police Command is the Lagos State branch of the Nigerian Police Force. It is responsible for law enforcement and crime prevention in the state. The commissioner of this command is often appointed by the Inspector-General of Police. The current commissioner of the state command is CP Abiodun Alabi. The current Public Relations Officer of the Command is SP Benjamin Hundeyin. The Lagos State Police Command has different area commands and zones.

Leadership
Commissioner Of Police: CP Abiodun Alabi
Area A- Lagos Island: ACP Olabode Olajuni
Area B-Apapa: ACP  
Area C-Surulere: ACP Tijani O Fatai
Area D-Mushin: ACP Aliko Dankoli
Area E-Festac: ACP Dahiru Muhammed
Area F-Ikeja: ACP Akinbayo Olasoji
Area G-Ogba: ACP Arumse Joe-Dan
Area H-Ogudu: ACP Dantawaye Miller
Area J-Ajah/Elemoro: ACP Gbolahan Julieth
Area K-Morogbo: ACP Ahmed M Jamiilu
Area L-Ilashe: ACP Bose Akinyemi
Area M-Idimu: ACP Ifeanyi Ohuruzor
Area N-Ijede/Ikorodu: ACP Shonubi Ayodele
Area P-Alagbado/Abesan Estate Gate: ACP Adepoju A. Olugbenga

See also
Lagos State Government
Lagos State Executive Council
Lagos State Judiciary
Nigeria Police Force

External links
State Security Trust Fund
Nigeria police watch

References

Law enforcement in Lagos State
Police Command
Law enforcement agencies of Nigeria